The Road to Los Angeles is a novel by the American writer John Fante. It was written in 1936, but was published posthumously in 1985 by Black Sparrow Press. The novel is one of four featuring Fante's alter ego Arturo Bandini. In the Bandini chronology, it is set after Wait Until Spring, Bandini and before Ask the Dust.

References

1936 American novels
1985 American novels
Novels by John Fante
Novels about writers
Novels published posthumously
Novels set in Los Angeles
Italian-American novels
1985 debut novels